Miroslav Jurka (born 7 June 1987) is a Czech handball player for HC Robe Zubří and the Czech national team.

He also played for Saint-Raphaël Var Handball.

References

External links

1987 births
Living people
Czech male handball players
People from Valašské Meziříčí
Expatriate handball players
Czech expatriate sportspeople in France
Sportspeople from the Zlín Region